Beauchamp Place (pronounced "Beecham Place") is a fashionable shopping street in the Knightsbridge district of London. It was known as Grove Place until 1885.

It was once better known for its brothels and lodging houses, but since the Edwardian era, antique shops and high end fashion boutiques have dominated the street.

Beauchamp Place was also a 16th-century mansion of the Seymour family, whose titles included Viscount Beauchamp. It belonged to Edward Seymour, Viscount Beauchamp, who became the Earl of Hertford and was the son of a Lord Protector of England.

See also
List of eponymous roads in London

References

Website: www.beauchamp-place.com

External links
 The Beauchamp Place Association
 

Streets in the Royal Borough of Kensington and Chelsea
Houses in the Royal Borough of Kensington and Chelsea
Tudor England
Seymour family
Knightsbridge
Shopping streets in London